Mike Royce (born 1964) is an American screenwriter and television producer.

Education
Raised in Syracuse, New York, Royce graduated from Jamesville-Dewitt High School in 1982, then went on to film school at Ithaca College where he graduated in 1986.

Career
From 1988 to 1999, Royce was a stand-up comedian in New York City. For several years, he was also a warmup comedian for such shows as The Maury Povich Show, Viva Variety, and Spin City. In 1997, he got his first job as a writer on MTV's Apartment 2F, which starred Randy and Jason Sklar. In 1999, Royce joined the writing staff of Everybody Loves Raymond, where he eventually worked his way up to the position of executive producer for the last two seasons. In 2005, Louis C.K. asked Royce to be the executive producer and show runner of a new sitcom, HBO's Lucky Louie.

In 2008, TNT ordered a pilot for a new series written by Royce and Ray Romano. By January 2009, TNT had ordered 10 episodes for the new series Men of a Certain Age, which premiered on Monday December 7, 2009 at 10:00. TNT picked up Men of a Certain Age for a second season as the ratings have increased with men in the age demographic of 25 to 54. On July 15, 2011, TNT cancelled the series after two seasons. In 2017, One Day at a Time premiered on Netflix starring Justina Machado and Rita Moreno. A reimagining of the 1975 Norman Lear sitcom, Royce co-created the 2017 version with Gloria Calderon Kellett. He is executive producer and co-showrunner of the series, alongside Ms. Kellett. In 2011, Mike Royce and his Snowpants Productions company signed a deal with 20th Century Fox Television. He produced two shows for his Fox deal, 1600 Penn and Enlisted. It later joined Sony Pictures in an overall deal and developed a failed CBS pilot.

Awards and nominations
Royce was nominated for an Emmy Award in 2003 for Outstanding Writing for a Comedy Series, for the Everybody Loves Raymond episode "Counseling". He and the other Raymond writers and producers won the Emmy for Best Comedy twice, in 2003, and 2005.

References

External links

1964 births
Living people
American stand-up comedians
American comedy writers
American television writers
American male television writers
Place of birth missing (living people)
Television producers from New York (state)
Ithaca College alumni
People from DeWitt, New York
Date of birth missing (living people)
Comedians from New York (state)
Screenwriters from New York (state)
21st-century American comedians
21st-century American screenwriters
21st-century American male writers